Sylhet Agricultural University is a flagship public research university in Sylhet, Bangladesh that formally started functioning on 2 November 2006. The veterinary medicine degree of this university is considered as nation's best because of the similarity in the syllabus with the Royal Veterinary College, London . It is also have the highest number of students studying abroad among other Bangladeshi agricultural  universities.

History
Sylhet Agricultural University started its function on 2 November 2006 following the issuance of a notification by the Government as per the requirement of the "Sylhet Agricultural University Act 2006" which was passed in the National Parliament on 3 October 2006. In fact, the faculty of Veterinary, Animal and Biomedical Sciences has come into being through the up-gradation of Sylhet Government Veterinary College (SGVC). The SGVC was established in 1995 and had been functioning as a "School of Life Sciences" under Shahjalal University of Science and Technology (SUST), Sylhet Bangladesh.

Presently 2501 (honours, masters and PhD) students are enrolled at the university.

Over 90 percent of the recurring budget and the entire development fund come from the government through the University Grants Commission (UGC).

Admission
As of from 2019 all agricultural university of Bangladesh conducting a cluster system admission tests where a single exam is taken for seven Universities which provide education in the field of Agricultural Sciences these are Bangabandhu Sheikh Mujibur Rahman Agricultural University , Bangladesh Agricultural University, Sher-e-Bangla Agricultural University, Chittagong Veterinary and Animal Sciences University, Sylhet Agricultural University, Khulna Agricultural University and Patuakhali Science and Technology University. The cluster system reduced students suffering and financial costs. Admission test is held on each campus but at a time with same question.

Colleges and departments
This university has six colleges (faculties) providing undergraduate and graduate studies:
College (faculty) of Veterinary, Animal and Biomedical Sciences
College (faculty) of Agriculture
College (faculty) of Fisheries
College (faculty) of Agricultural Economics and Business Studies
College (faculty) of Agricultural Engineering and Technology
College (faculty) of Biotechnology and Genetic Engineering

Vice-chancellors

While the Chancellor is the ceremonial head, a position held by the incumbent President of Bangladesh, the Vice-chancellor is the chief academic officer and chief executive of the university appointed by the Chancellor for a four-year term. These have been and are:

References

External links 

 Official Website
 Ministry of Agriculture
 Ministry of Fisheries and Livestock
 Ministry of Education
 University Grants Commission Bangladesh
 Ministry of Food
 Ministry of Science and Technology

Organisations based in Sylhet
Educational institutions established in 1995
1995 establishments in Bangladesh
Educational institutions established in 2006
2006 establishments in Bangladesh